Khesht-e Nadari (also Romanized as Khesht-e Nādarī; also known as Khesht) is a village in Kabud Gonbad Rural District, in the Central District of Kalat County, Razavi Khorasan Province, Iran. At the 2006 census, its population was 455, in 114 families.

References 

Populated places in Kalat County